The La Grange Presbyterian Church, also known as the La Grange Rotary Club, is a historic Presbyterian church building located on Caswell Street in La Grange, Lenoir County, North Carolina. It was constructed in 1892, and is a Gothic Revival style frame building.

It was added to the National Register of Historic Places in August 1986. It is located in the La Grange Historic District.

See also
 National Register of Historic Places listings in Lenoir County, North Carolina

References

19th-century Presbyterian church buildings in the United States
Carpenter Gothic church buildings in North Carolina
Churches in Lenoir County, North Carolina
National Register of Historic Places in Lenoir County, North Carolina
Presbyterian churches in North Carolina
Churches on the National Register of Historic Places in North Carolina
Churches completed in 1892
Historic district contributing properties in North Carolina